Charles Edward McDonnell (February 1, 1854 – August 8, 1921) was an American prelate of the Roman Catholic Church. He served as Bishop of Brooklyn from 1892 until his death in 1921.

Biography
Charles McDonnell was born in Manhattan to Charles and Eleanor (née Preston) McDonnell. His father was a printer. After attending De La Salle Institute, he entered St. Francis Xavier College in 1868. He was sent to Rome by Cardinal John McCloskey in 1872 to further his studies at the Pontifical North American College. While in Rome, he was ordained to the priesthood on May 19, 1878. He earned his Doctor of Divinity degree shortly afterwards.
 
Following his return to New York in the fall of 1878, he was named a curate St. Mary's Church on Grand Street until 1879, when he was transferred to St. Stephen's Church under Rev. Edward McGlynn, and afterwards to St. Patrick's Cathedral, where he served as master of ceremonies from 1879 to 1884. He became private secretary to Cardinal McCloskey in 1884, and remained in that position under McCloskey's successor, Michael Corrigan, who also named him chancellor of the Archdiocese of New York in 1889. In 1890 he was made Private Chamberlain by Pope Leo XIII.

On March 11, 1892, McDonnell was appointed the second Bishop of Brooklyn by Leo XIII. He received his episcopal consecration on the following April 25 from Archbishop Michael Corrigan at St. Patrick's Cathedral. He was installed at St. James's Pro-Cathedral, Brooklyn, New York on May 2, 1892. His first official act was the dedication of the new St. Augustine Church, on May 15, 1892, followed by conferring Confirmation to 600 individuals on the following May 18 at Church of the Sacred Heart.

During his 29-year-long tenure, the number of Catholics in the diocese increased from 250,000 in 1891 to 900,000 in 1921. He erected 54 parishes and schools for new immigrant groups settling in the diocese, many from Italy and Eastern Europe, as well as for Hispanics and African Americans. Bishop McDonnell adopted the policy of securing members of some order for each of the races and languages in his jurisdiction. He invited several religious institutes into the diocese, including the Redemptorists, Benedictines, Franciscans (including the Minor Conventuals and Capuchins), Jesuits, Sisters of the Holy Family of Nazareth, Missionary Sisters of the Sacred Heart, Daughters of Wisdom, and Sisters of the Holy Infant Jesus.

He established the forerunner of the Catholic Schools Office in 1894 and Catholic Charities in 1899. He was named an Assistant at the Pontifical Throne in 1903, and founded the diocesan newspaper, The Tablet, in 1908. To the institutions of the diocese Bishop McDonnell added two hospitals and largely increased the capacity of one of those already established; the Ozanam Home for Friendless Women; the new St. Vincent's Home for Friendless Boys; two seaside recreation places for children and a trade school farm for orphans. He was described by the Brooklyn Eagle as "learned, judicious, amiable, firm and persuasive." McDonnell later died from kidney trouble in Brentwood, aged 67. He was waked in St. James's Pro-Cathedral and buried alongside Bishop Loughlin in the downstairs crypt.

References

1854 births
1921 deaths
19th-century Roman Catholic bishops in the United States
20th-century Roman Catholic bishops in the United States
People from Manhattan
Roman Catholic bishops of Brooklyn
Religious leaders from New York (state)